The list of fish in Germany consists of indigenous, and also introduced species. In total it consists of 277 species, including three which are extinct.

The following tags are used to indicate the conservation status of species with IUCN criteria:

All the listed species are classified by their origin as freshwater, brackish water, marine, anadromous, catadromous, and euryhaline; also classified as native, introduced, invasive, and species found accidentally (difficult to characterize it as native or invasive).

References 
 Fishes of Germany at FishBase
 Borcherding J., Staas S., Krüger S., Ondračková M., Šlapanský L., Jurajda P. (2011) Non-native Gobiid species in the lower River Rhine (Germany): recent range extensions and densities. Journal of Applied Ichthyology, 27: 153–155.
 Borcherding J., Gertzen S., Staas S. (2011) First record of Pontian racer goby, Babka gymnotrachelus (Gobiidae: Teleostei), in the River Rhine, Germany. Journal of Applied Ichthyology, 27(6): 1399–1400.
 Nehring S., Steinhof J. (2015) First records of the invasive Amur sleeper, Perccottus glenii Dybowski, 1877 in German freshwaters: a need for realization of effective management measures to stop the invasion. BioInv. Rec., 4: 223–232.

Germany
Fish
Fish
Germany